The Kansas Lottery 150 is an ARCA Menards Series race held at the Kansas Speedway in Kansas City, Kansas. The inaugural race was held in 2001. From 2012 to 2021, this race was the season-finale for the series. The race was originally 201 miles and 134 laps long until 2006. Each year since 2007 to 2010 and since 2016, the race has been 150 miles and 100 laps long. The race was 148.5 miles and 99 laps from 2011 to 2015 to match the name of the race, the 98.9. It has been held on the same weekend as the NASCAR Cup Series Hollywood Casino 400 since 2009.

In 2020, 2021 and 2022, the track also hosted a second ARCA Menards Series race held on the same weekend as the other NASCAR Cup Series race at the track.

History

In 2021, the candy company Reese's, which joined ARCA as a corporate partner that year, also became the title sponsor of the season-finale race of the series, replacing Speediatrics. Reese's returned to racing sponsorship for the first time in 10 years, as they were previously a sponsor for Kevin Harvick in both the Xfinity and Cup Series when he drove for Richard Childress Racing, but left after the 2010 season. In 2022, Reese's switched their title sponsorship to the race at Lucas Oil Indianapolis Raceway Park and the Kansas Lottery, which was the title sponsor of the race from 2004 to 2013, returned as the title sponsor of the race.

Past winners

2004: Race shortened due to rain.
2009 & 2021: Race extended due to a green–white–checker finish.
2013: Race shortened due to threatening weather.

References

External links
 

2001 establishments in Kansas
ARCA Menards Series races
ARCA Menards Series
Motorsport in Kansas
Recurring sporting events established in 2001
Sports in the Kansas City metropolitan area
NASCAR races at Kansas Speedway